Hoàng Mai is an urban district (quận) of Hanoi, the capital city of Vietnam. The district currently has 14 wards, covering a total area of 40.32 square kilometers. As of 2019, there were 506,347 people residing in the district, the highest of all districts in Hanoi.  The district borders Thanh Trì District, Thanh Xuân District, Gia Lâm District, Long Biên District, Hai Bà Trưng District.

History
Hoàng Mai was founded as an urban district by Vietnamese government's Decree 132/2003/NĐ-CP on 6 November 2003 from 5 wards of Hai Bà Trưng and 9 communes of Thanh Trì.

Administrative divisions
Hoàng Mai District is divided into 14 wards (Đại Kim, Định Công, Giáp Bát, Hoàng Liệt, Hoàng Văn Thụ, Lĩnh Nam, Mai Động, Tân Mai, Thanh Trì, Thịnh Liệt, Trần Phú, Tương Mai, Vĩnh Hưng, Yên Sở).

References

Districts of Hanoi